Petru Iosub (born 16 June 1961) is a retired Romanian rower. He first competed in coxless fours, placing fifth at the 1980 Olympics and winning a bronze medal at the 1982 World Championships. Later he changed to coxless pairs and won a gold medal at the 1984 Olympics, together with Valer Toma.

References

1961 births
Living people
Romanian male rowers
Olympic rowers of Romania
Olympic gold medalists for Romania
Rowers at the 1980 Summer Olympics
Rowers at the 1984 Summer Olympics
Olympic medalists in rowing
Medalists at the 1984 Summer Olympics
World Rowing Championships medalists for Romania